Ouigo is a French low-cost service range of both conventional and high-speed trains. The literal translation of Ouigo from French to English is "yes go;" the name is also a play on words with the English homonym "we go." It is composed of two different services: Ouigo Grande Vitesse, which is a brand of SNCF operating high-speed trains; and Ouigo Vitesse Classique, a brand under which Oslo, a subsidiary of SNCF, operates conventional speed trains.

Ouigo was established in 2013 to offer budget long-distance services on the core routes of the French railway network. The first train ran on 2 April 2013. Ouigo rolling stock was configured in a 'no-frills' arrangement, with minimal onboard amenities, and a single class of seating. It was intended that passengers seeking a higher-level service would continue to use SNCF's regular high-speed trains since rebranded as TGV inOui. Ouigo quickly proved popular with the travelling public, selling in excess of 2.5 million tickets during its first year of operation, and was rapidly expanded to cover more stations and regions.

On 10 December 2017, Ouigo launched a new timetable and began to serve the central Paris termini for the first time. SNCF stated in the late 2010s that they sought for around 25 percent of the travelling public to use the Ouigo service. Originally, Ouigo operated only TGV high-speed train sets, but on 11 April 2022, the Ouigo Vitesse Classique service launched, using older locomotive-hauled rolling stock on conventional lines; it is slower, but with even cheaper tickets available. The high-speed service was therefore rebranded as Ouigo Grande Vitesse.

During the early 2020s, SNCF decided to expand Ouigo internationally for the first time, establishing the sister company Ouigo España to offer a similar service in neighbouring Spain.

Development

Background

In contrast to Europe's relatively liberalized airline market (open skies), the high-speed railways of many countries, including France, have traditionally been operated as a monopoly that is financed and owned by the respective national government. However, during the early twenty-first century, there was an increasing push towards the liberalization of the railways. In particular, the European Union had announced targets for reforming high-speed railways for greater involvement of private operators set as early as December 2019. Furthermore, competition from low-cost airlines, as well as the anticipation of the deregulation of the intercity bus market, which had happened in Germany during the early 2010s and shortly thereafter in France, had motivated incumbent operators to seek to increase their competitiveness. Accordingly, the French state railway operator SNCF decided that it should launch a low cost operator of high speed trains, which it would brand as Ouigo.

On 19 February 2013, the Ouigo initiative was announced by Guillaume Pepy, the head of SNCF. In an April 2013 interview with CNN Business Traveller, Pepy stated his hopes that, if Ouigo is successful, it can be expanded and, at an indeterminate future date, provide services beyond France to the capitals of neighbouring countries, specifically naming Brussels, Amsterdam and London. Early on, SNCF also declared that it hoped to also offer Ouigo services to the south west of France by 2017, principally Bordeaux. In the few months between announcement and the commencement of passenger operators, Ouigo had reportedly sold 200,000 tickets while its website had been visited in excess of two million times.

On 2 April 2013, Ouigo was formally launched, with the first trains being run that same day. On 12 September 2013, SNCF announced that a sales milestone of one million tickets had been sold; at the same time, it was mentioned that of those tickets, 35 percent had been purchased for less than €35. On 1 April 2014, SNCF announced that, over the previous year, Ouigo had sold over 2.5 million tickets, of which 80 percent had been priced at €25 euros or less. It also announced that the Ouigo website had been visited roughly 10 million times.

Expansion
On 3 September 2015, SNCF announced that additional Ouigo services would commence during the first quarter of 2016; these would link Tourcoing (near Lille) with Lyon-Part-Dieu, Nantes and Rennes, having intermediate stops in TGV Haute-Picardie, Aéroport Charles de Gaulle, Massy TGV, Le Mans and Angers-Saint-Laud. Tickets for these destinations first went on sale on 17 November 2015. It was later announced that Ouigo would be start serving these new destinations on 13 December 2015. Around this same time, SNCF relaunched and expanded its IDBus long-distance bus service as Ouibus, aligning its branding with that of Ouigo under the collective banner of #Oui, and shared the same no-frills low-cost online travel service. This service offered €10 million reduced-priced tickets for sale during 2016.

In May 2017, as part of a new strategy, SNCF rebranded its TGV service as TGV inOui to align it as a high-end counterpart to the low-cost services provided by Ouigi. By this point, Ouigo reportedly carries 5 percent of all high-speed passengers in France; SNCF openly stated that it intends that, by 2020, 25% of all high-speed passengers will travel aboard Ouigo services, which were set to expand its coverage to 30 destinations that it would serve using its fleet of 34 trainsets. The initial routes served by Ouigo at the launch of operations, along LGV Sud-Est, LGV Rhône-Alpes and LGV Méditerranée, have proved to be among the most frequently trafficked on the French high-speed network. During the late 2010s, SNCF stated that the growth of its high-speed services has been primarily due to Ouigo's expansion.

On 10 December 2017, Ouigo launched a new timetable, under which it ran services to stations within the centre of Paris for the first time. Specifically, destinations across western France were directly connected to Gare Montparnasse, while two round trips per day are in operation on both the Paris - Bordeaux and Paris - Le Mans - Nantes routes, along with a single daily service between Paris and Rennes. Ouigo opted to charge more for tickets that board within central Paris rather than at Massy, Marne-la-Valley, or Roissy Charles de Gaulle Airport on the periphery of the city. In July 2018, Gare de l'Est joined the Ouigo network, while Ouigo services from Gare de Lyon were launched later that same year. On 6 July 2019, direct trains between Gare Montparnasse and Toulouse commenced, replacing a former TGV InOui service as well as marking the expansion of Ouigo into southwest France.

Since June 2020, Ouigo has been running services between inner city stations of both Paris and Lyon. Furthermore, the inner city train stations of Lyon-Perrache and Lyon-Part-Dieu have also been included in the route network, along with direct connections to the center of Paris. During winter 2020/21, Ouigo trains were run in the French Alps to Grenoble and further along the Tarentaise to Albertville, Moutiers-Salins-Brides-les-Bains, Aime-la-Plagne and Bourg-Saint-Maurice.

International and classic services
On 22 September 2020, SNCF announced that, via its Spanish subsidiary Rielsfera, high-speed services in Spain would be launched during the following year as a part of its low-cost brand, using the name Ouigo España. The Spanish service will be largely modelled on that of the existing Ouigo operation. Ouigo España, which launched operations in 2021, carried roughly two million passengers in its first twelve months of operation.

Between 2013 and 2021, Ouigo exclusively operated high-speed TGV train sets for its services. However, in September 2021, it was announced that 14 new services would be launched using conventional locomotive-hauled trains under the new Ouigo Vitesse Classique branding, while its high-speed services shall be rebranded under the Ouigo Grande Vitesse name. Both operations will share the same low-cost business model, the new Classique services make intensive use of refurbished Corail coaches originally built for SNCF during the 1970s and 1980s. On 11 April 2022, the Ouigo Vitesse Classique service was launched, initially operating three trains per day along a pair of conventional lines that served a total of 14 stations. At the time, Christophe Fanichet, CEO of SNCF Voyageurs, stated that if the service proved successful, new routes would likely be intentionally parallel to heavily trafficked car routes.

Concept
The idea of service is based on low-cost airlines such as Ryanair and EasyJet; accordingly, Ouigo operates the following practices:
 Tickets can only be bought online through a dedicated website or mobile app, not from ticket machines, ticket counters, or through the regular SNCF website. Since October 2013, customers can also book tickets via the non-affiliated booking agent Captain Train. They must be purchased at least 4 hours in advance of the journey. Four days before passengers travel, they receive an e-mail of the ticket which they may print out at home, or they may use the mobile app to access the e-ticket.
 Use of high-density trainsets.
 Similar to some low-cost airlines, whilst a piece of hand luggage (maximum size, 35 cm × 55 cm × 25 cm; 14" x 22" x 10") is allowed free of charge, larger bags must be paid for. 
 Like the low-cost carriers' use of secondary airports (e.g., Paris-Beauvais) instead of major airports (e.g., Paris-Charles de Gaulle), the company uses some non-major railway stations (e.g., Marne-la-Vallée for Paris instead of Paris-Gare de Lyon, Tourcoing for Lille and Lyon Saint-Exupéry for Lyon). The reason is the same: Ouigo uses these outgoing stations due to lower fees imposed by the rail network company, SNCF Réseau. 
 The trains carry fewer staff, who (like low-cost airlines' staff) are tasked to do basic maintenance of the train as well as serving passengers.
 The company puts their own trains on a 13-hour shift daily, instead of the regular SNCF TGV 7-hour shift. This maximises vehicle utilisation as it reduces trainset downtime in the depot, whilst simultaneously increasing the number of seats offered for the same number of trains in the fleet.
 Like some low-cost air carriers, the only way customers can contact the company is via their website. There is no customer service phone number or e-mail address.

Ouigo Grande Vitesse

Stations

Ouigo Grande Vitesse offers trains in 47 stations in France, going as far as Tourcoing, Strasbourg, Nice, Montpellier-Saint-Roch, Toulouse via Bordeaux-Saint-Jean, Nantes, and Rennes.

OGV network
Ouigo Grande Vitesse serves the following lines:
  – Aéroport Charles de Gaulle 2 TGV –  –  –  –  – 
  –  – Aéroport Charles de Gaulle 2 TGV – Marne-la-Vallée–Chessy –  –  –  –  – 
  –  – Aéroport Charles de Gaulle 2 TGV – Marne-la-Vallée–Chessy –  –  –  – 
  –  –  – Massy TGV – Paris-Montparnasse 
  –  – Massy TGV – Paris-Montparnasse
 Paris-Est –  – 
 Paris-Montparnasse – Saint-Pierre-des-Corps – Poitiers – Bordeaux-Saint-Jean
 Paris-Montparnasse –  –  –  – 
 Paris-Lyon – Lyon-Saint-Exupéry TGV – Aix-en-Provence TGV –  –  –  –  –  – 
 Paris-Lyon – Avignon TGV – Aix-en-Provence TGV – Marseille-Saint-Charles
 Paris-Lyon – Valence TGV –  –

Rolling stock
Ouigo Grande Vitesse uses modified double-decker TGV Duplex trains, which are single 2nd class made up of either 2 x 2 or 3 x 1 abreast non-reclining seats, and lack a buffet car. This leads to the train carrying up to 1268 passengers (634 per trainset), which is 20% more passengers than regular TGV Duplex trains.

Fare structure
Adult fares can vary from as little as €10 to a maximum of €115 per journey depending on the time of the journey and how far it is booked in advance. Supplementary fees are as follows:
 Children that are 11 or under, a flat fee of €5 is charged no matter the journey.
 Baggage (per piece) is €5 if booked at the time of booking, €10 prior to travelling on-line, or €20 if purchased at the station immediately prior to travel. 
 Pets can be taken on board, however, provided that they are under six kilos (14 lb) and they are in the carry case as part of the hand luggage they travel free. If not, they are charged a fee of €40 per animal, or €30 if they are booked at the same time as the owner. 
 Seats next to plug sockets can be reserved for a supplementary fee of €2 per person.
 Tickets are not part of the European rail ticket network so tickets don't appear in all booking systems also means Interrail & Eurail passes are not valid along with through ticketing not being possible.

Ouigo Train Classique

Introduced in April 2022, this service will serve as a successor to the Intercités 100% Eco services which were discontinued in 2020.

Unlike the high-speed service, Ouigo Train Classique is operated by a subsidiary of SNCF Voyages Développement named Oslo (Offre de Services Librement Organisés).

OTC network
Ouigo Train Classique serves three lines:
 Paris-Austerlitz – Juvisy – Massy-Palaiseau – Versailles-Chantiers – Chartres – Le Mans – Angers-Saint-Laud – Nantes
 Paris-Austerlitz – Juvisy – Les Aubrais – Blois Saint-Pierre-des-Corps – Saumur – Angers-Saint-Laud – Nantes
 Paris Bercy –  – Melun – Dijon-Ville – Chalon-sur-Saône – Mâcon-Ville – Lyon-Perrache

Rolling stock
The service uses Corail cars, hauled by SNCF Class BB 22200 locomotives.

Fare structure
 Ticket price is fixed on each train between €10 and €30 when ticket sales open, and won't change until the train eventually sells out.
 Children that are 11 or under, a flat fee of €5 is charged no matter the journey.
 Baggage (per piece) is €5 if booked at the time of booking, €10 prior to travelling on-line, or €20 if purchased at the station immediately prior to travel.
 Bikes can be carried on board for a €10 fee at the time of booking

Reception
In the first few months, Ouigo sent passengers a short questionnaire after each trip, and has had a 20 percent response rate. The responses gathered had reportedly surprised the company, as roughly half of the passengers saying they came from the regular TGV service, short of the 70 percent that the company had envisaged, while a quarter of respondents said they would have not made the trip without Ouigo. The survey also reported that about 90 percent of passengers would recommend Ouigo to a friend or family member.

Commentators such as the travel journalist Simon Calder have said that Ouigo is a third-class train service, while the rail writer Mark Smith called it a rail service for flyers. The head of the rail division of the trade union CGT Bruno Charrier, referred to Ouigo as being a train service created for the poor. Initially, non-French customers had issues trying to book tickets, as the service requested from its users a French mobile phone number and postcode. However, since October 2013, the website has been changed to allow foreign customers to book tickets; the phone number is needed to provide information by text message for passengers in case of any issues.

Among English-speaking high-speed rail advocates, opinion has been divided. The British HSR lobbying group, Greengauge 21 is keen on the idea of low-cost high-speed rail service, and with it, the possibility of employing underused stations such as Stratford International and Ebbsfleet International.

See also
 List of high-speed railway lines
 Ouigo España

References

External links

 

SNCF
SNCF brands
Low-cost high-speed rail services